The 1941 Copa del Generalísimo was the 39th staging of the Copa del Rey, the Spanish football cup competition.

The competition began on 23 March 1941 and concluded on 29 June 1941 with the final.

First round

|}
Tiebreaker

|}

Second round

|}

Third round

|}

Round of 16

|}
Tiebreaker

|}

Quarter-finals

|}
Tiebreaker

|}

Semi-finals

|}

Final

|}

External links
 rsssf.com
 linguasport.com

Copa del Rey seasons
Copa del Rey
Copa